September 2015

See also

References 

 09
September 2015 events in the United States